A unit still photographer, or simply a still photographer, is a person who creates film stills, still photographic images specifically intended for use in the marketing and publicity of feature films in the motion picture industry and network television productions. Besides creating photographs for the promotion of a film, the still photographer contributes daily to the filming process by creating set stills. With these, the photographer is careful to record all details of the cast wardrobe, set appearance and background. 

Cornel Lucas, a pioneer of film portraiture in the 1940s and 1950s, was the first still photographer to be awarded a BAFTA, in 1998, for work with the British Film Industry.

Uses in the industry 
Using individual frames from film or recorded video material is not practical due to their relatively low quality. Much higher resolution images are therefore used. Typically, the end uses of these still photos include the film's theatrical release poster, DVD box artwork, the official website photos, billboards, bus stop adverts, point-of-purchase displays, key art image sets released to the press and media, and other printed and online collateral materials.

Unit still photographers are also responsible for creating "photo props" and "set dressing images", the photos and images used on-camera to create various illusions such as forensic photos, crime drama booking photos, character driver's licenses, passport and I.D. photos, on-screen family photos, surveillance photos, computer screen displays, and any other image a producer may require in the course of a production.

In North America in particular, and some international locations, a unit still photographer must be a member of IATSE Local 600 International Cinematographers Guild in order to perform services on union productions and union studio lots and locations.  The most prestigious of these unit still photographers are members of The Society of Motion Picture Still Photographers, an organization which promotes the work of those within the industry.

In the past, the director, costumer or the director of photography may have referred to these still images for continuity purposes as the unit stills photographer was the only crew member permitted to take still photographs on set, but with the introduction of instant cameras such as the Polaroid, and subsequent digital photo cameras, this job of taking continuity images has fallen to the continuity and script supervisor.

While often perceived as a "glamour" job for photographers, the reality is often long hours (70-plus hours per week) in remote locations under difficult and often extreme conditions.  The unit still photographer often coordinates with the unit publicist but physically works in close proximity to the film's camera crew, director and actors, and also in close proximity to the film's boom microphone operator. Unit still photographers go to great lengths to muffle the sound of their camera's motor drive and shutter to avoid distracting the actors, and to remain inaudible on the film's recorded dialogue soundtrack.

Typically, this is accomplished using a sound blimp, which is a sound-absorbing, foam-filled metal case in which the still camera body is fitted with a proprietary remote operation cable. This allows the camera to be activated and operated from a two-button (activation, focus, and shutter release) exterior control. Limitations exist once the blimp is closed around the camera, as one can no longer access the camera controls (f-number, shutter speed, ASA/ISO settings) or menu displays directly. The LCD display for reviewing the images will also be obscured in the closed position.  This requires the photographer to make control selections in advance and use those settings until the take in progress has been "cut", making adjustments only between takes or set-ups. Unit still photographers in this field typically produce over 2000 marketable images per week for their major-studio clients. 

Since 2010, high-end DSLR cameras, which can be remotely controlled with mobile apps on smartphones and tablet computers, using the built-in 2-way Wi-Fi radio-controlled interface between the tablet and the DSLR camera, and offer internal active noise reduction technologies, have increased the ability of the unit still photographer to work quietly on the set.

Notable still photographers
Marcia Reed (born 1948), American
Arthur "Weegee" Fellig (born 1899), American

References

Further reading 
 Stage and Theater Photography, Jeff Lowenthal, 1965. ASIN B000NU0SJU
 The Alvin Ailey American Dance Theater, photography by Susan Cook; commentary by Joseph H. Mazo, New York, Morrow (1978). , 
 Creative Techniques in Stage & Theatrical Photography, by Paddy Cutts, Rosemary Curr, Quite Specific Media Group (September 1983), .
 Photography and the Performing Arts, Gerry Kopelow, Focal Press (June 9, 1994), .
 The Complete Guide to Night and Low-Light Photography, Lee Frost, Amphoto Books (March 15, 2000), .
 Movie Photos: The guide to marketing and publicity photography, Alex Bailey, Imagebarn (19 Jun 2008),

External links 
IATSE Local 600 International Cinematographers Guild
The Society of Motion Picture Still Photographers
 ''Barton B. MacLeod, Still Photographer "The Green Berets" movie starring John Wayne  (http://www.BartonMacLeod.com)
 Still Photographer Studio Contract at The Ned Scott Archive
Guide to the Motion Picture Stills Collection 1920-1934 at the University of Chicago Special Collections Research Center

Filmmaking occupations
Mass media occupations
Photographers by subject